Delaporte may refer to:

Arthur Delaporte (born 1991), French politician
Charles Delaporte (1880–1949), French rower and cyclist
Florence Delaporte, French writer, winner of the 1998 Prix Wepler
Louis Delaporte, French explorer and artist
Louis Joseph Delaporte, French archaeologistist
Philip Delaporte, German-American Protestant missionary and translator
Sophie Delaporte, French photographer and artist

See also
De la Porte
Laporte (disambiguation)